Homocitric acid is an organic compound with the formula HOC(CO2H)(CH2CO2H)(C2H4CO2H).  This tricarboxylic acid occurs naturally as a component of the iron-molybdenum cofactor of certain nitrogenase proteins.  Biochemists often refer to this cofactor as homocitrate, which is the conjugate bases that predominate in neutral aqueous solutions of this species.

The molecule is related to citric acid by the addition of one methylene unit, hence the prefix "homo." Unlike citric acid, homocitric acid is chiral.  The acid exists in equilibrium with the lactone.

See also
 Homoisocitric acid

References

Alpha hydroxy acids
Chelating agents
Tricarboxylic acids